Anthony Stark may refer to:

 Anthony Stark (director) (1961–2011), American film director and screenwriter
 Anthony "Tony" Stark, also known as Iron Man, a Marvel Comics superhero
 Tony Stark (Marvel Cinematic Universe)

See also
Anthony Starke (born 1963), American actor
Anthony Starks (1873–1952), English rugby league footballer